USS LST-50 was an  built for the United States Navy during World War II.

LST-50 was laid down on 29 August 1943 at Pittsburgh, Pennsylvania by the Dravo Corporation; launched on 16 October 1943; sponsored by Mrs. Tito Tarquinio; and commissioned on 27 November 1943.

Service history

US Navy, 1942–1946
The tank landing ship was initially assigned to the European Theater and participated in the invasion of Normandy between 6 and 25 June 1944 and the invasion of southern France between 15 August and 25 September 1944. She was later transferred to the Asiatic-Pacific Theater of operations where she took part in the Okinawa assault between 18 and 30 June 1945. Following the war, LST-50 performed occupation duty in the Far East until early February 1946. Upon her return to the United States, the ship was decommissioned on 6 February 1946 and was struck from the Naval Vessel Register on 8 September 1952.

Norway & Greece, 1952–
On 14 November 1952, she was redesignated USS ARB-13 and transferred to Norway as HNoMS Ellida (A534). She was returned to the United States on 1 July 1960, but was retransferred to Greece on 16 September 1960 and served with the Greek Navy as Sakipia (A329). Her final fate is unknown.
 
LST-50 earned three battle stars for World War II service.

References

 
 

LST-1-class tank landing ships of the United States Navy
Ships built in Pittsburgh
1943 ships
World War II amphibious warfare vessels of the United States
Battle damage repair ships of the United States Navy
World War II auxiliary ships of the United States
Ships transferred from the United States Navy to the Royal Norwegian Navy
Auxiliary ships of the Royal Norwegian Navy
Ships transferred from the United States Navy to the Hellenic Navy
Auxiliary ships of the Hellenic Navy
Aristaeus-class repair ships converted from LST-1-class ships
Ships built by Dravo Corporation